Margie Palatini is the author of many popular books for young children. She was born in Edison, New Jersey, and today lives in nearby Plainfield, New Jersey. Margie is a graduate of the Moore College of Art and Design. According to her website, all of her books cannot be published if they do not pass her son's "giggle test".

Books 
 Piggie Pie (1995, illustrated by Howard Fine)
 Zak's Lunch (1998, illustrated by Howard Fine)
 The Web Files (2001, illustrated by Richard Egielski)
 Tub-Boo-Boo (2001, illustrated by Michael Koelsch)
 Earthquack!  (2002, illustrated by Barry Moser)
 The Three Silly Billies (2005, illustrated by Barry Moser) 
 Lousy Rotten Stinkin' Grapes (2009, illustrated by Barry Moser)

External links
 Official Site

Living people
American children's writers
Writers from Plainfield, New Jersey
Year of birth missing (living people)
People from Edison, New Jersey
Moore College of Art and Design alumni
American women children's writers
21st-century American women